Mil, mil, or MIL may refer to:

Places
 Mil, Syria, a village in Syria
 Mil, Azerbaijan, a municipality in Beylagan Rayon
 Mil, Markazi, a village in Markazi Province, Iran
 Metropolitan area of Milan (IATA code: MIL), Italy (Milan is city in Italy)
 Mill Hill Broadway railway station (National Rail station code: MIL), England
 Miltenberg (district), (German vehicle registration code: MIL)
 A common abbreviation for the U.S. city of Milwaukee, Wisconsin and its major professional sports teams:
 Milwaukee Brewers, the city's Major League Baseball team
 Milwaukee Bucks, the city's National Basketball Association team

Business and organizations
 Marine Industries Limited, a Canadian shipbuilder
 Microsystems International Limited, a former Canadian semiconductor device manufacturer
 Mil Moscow Helicopter Plant, a Russian helicopter manufacturer
 Movimiento Ibérico de Liberación (Iberian Liberation Movement), a Catalan anti-Francoist group from 1971 to 1973
 Mouvement initiative et liberté (Initiative and Liberty Movement), a French Gaullist political association
 mil.ru, official website of the Ministry of Defence (Russia)

Currency
 Mill (currency), a now-abstract unit of currency used sometimes in accounting
 mil, 1/1000 Cypriot pound
 mil, (1⁄10-cent) of Hong Kong dollar
 mil, 1/1000 Maltese lira
 mil, 1/1000 Palestine pound

Military
 .mil, the top-level Internet domain of the U.S. military
 MIL-STD and MIL-SPEC, the United States Military Standard

Technology
 Malfunction indicator lamp, in a computerized engine-management system
 Media Integration Layer, the compositing engine used by Desktop Window Manager and Windows Presentation Foundation

Units of measurement
 mil (imperial), a length equivalent to 0.001 inch
 Biblical mile (Hebrew: מיל / mīl), a length
 Millilitre (SI-symbol mL or ml, informally "mil"), a volume
 Millimetre (SI-symbol mm, informally "mil" or “mill”), a length
 Milliradian (SI-symbol mrad, informally "mil", or three slightly different non-SI units), for angular measurement
 Scandinavian mile, (Norwegian and Swedish: mil), a length equivalent to 10 kilometres

People
 Míl Espáine, ancestor to the Irish in Irish mythology
 Mil Máscaras (born 1942), Mexican luchador (professional wrestler)
 Mikhail Mil (1909–1970), founder of the Mil Moscow Helicopter Plant

Other
Mother-in-law

See also
 1,000,000, one million
 Mill (disambiguation)
 Per mille, or per mil, parts per thousand